The Presbytery of Northern New England is one of the 22 Presbyteries of the Synod of the Northeast of the Presbyterian Church (USA). Its congregations are located in Vermont, New Hampshire, Maine and northeastern Massachusetts. In New England, Presbyterian congregations have a very sparse density.

The Presbytery supports the MATE (Mission at the Eastward)

References

External links
Presbytery of Northern New England : official website

Presbyterian Church (USA) presbyteries
Religion in New England